"Raspberry Swirl" is a song written and performed by Tori Amos. It was released as the second single from her 1998 album From the Choirgirl Hotel in Germany and Australia, and as the third and final single in North America and the UK. In the United States it was released as a double A-side single with "Cruel", off the same album. In Germany, Australia and the UK it was released as its own single. Two variations of an identical 12" vinyl promotional release were issued in the U.K.

"Raspberry Swirl" was Amos's first single to be nominated for a Grammy Award, being nominated for Best Female Rock Vocal Performance in 1999.

About
"Raspberry Swirl" is about Amos' past relationship with a female friend and was written in response to the men in her relationships.

Music video

The video for Raspberry Swirl was directed by Barnaby & Scott and filmed in August 1998.

Review
"The fourth track, Raspberry Swirl (as in, unsurprisingly, 'Boy, you better make her raspberry swirl"), is the key," enthused John Aizlewood in Q's review of From the Choirgirl Hotel. "Seemingly throwaway, its programming doffs a cap to dance [and] Amos' treated vocals recall Van Helden mixmastery. Before 30 seconds have passed, she's declared 'Let's go' and in one cathartic moment becomes her own woman again, via the remainder of a song that doesn't need twists to shine."

Track listings
"Raspberry Swirl" was released in the United States and Canada as a double A-side with "Cruel".

US and Canada CD single
 "Cruel" (Shady Feline Mix) –3:51
 "Raspberry Swirl (Lip Gloss Version) – 3:41
 "Ambient Raspberry Swirl" (Scarlet Spectrum Feels) – 8:10
 "Mainline Cherry" (Ambient Spark) – 5:11

US 7" vinyl single (Atlantic 7-84412)
 "Raspberry Swirl" (Lip Gloss Version) – 3:39
 "Cruel" (Shady Feline Mix) – 3:49

German/Australian CD single
"Raspberry Swirl" was released in Germany as a single title.

 "Raspberry Swirl" (Lip Gloss Version) – 3:38
 "Raspberry Swirl" (Sticky Extended Vocal Mix) – 7:50
 "Raspberry Swirl" (Scarlet Spectrum Feels) – 8:10

UK promotional 12"
Two variations of a 12" vinyl promotional single were issued in the UK. They share a catalog number but have different artwork.

 "Raspberry Swirl" (Sticky Extended Instrumental) – 9:34
 "Raspberry Swirl" (Sticky Extended Vocal Mix) – 7:50

UK CD Single
 "Raspberry Swirl" (Lip Gloss Version) – 3:38
 "Raspberry Swirl" (Naked) – 3:44

Charts

References

Tori Amos songs
Songs written by Tori Amos
Atlantic Records singles
1998 singles
1998 songs
Electronic dance music songs